HMNZS Wellington (P55) is a  in the Royal New Zealand Navy.

History
The ship was built by Tenix as part of the New Zealand government's Royal New Zealand Navy plans, and was originally expected to enter service during the winter of 2008. However, in late 2008, it became known that the vessel was considered "sub-standard", and did not fulfill a number of specifications, such as being 100 tonnes overweight, making it unfit for Antarctic duties. The future crew that was already stationed with the vessel was sent back to New Zealand after the ship returned to Melbourne, until the dispute with the contractor was resolved.

Wellington was accepted into the Royal New Zealand Navy on 6 May 2010 and arrived at the Devonport (Auckland) Naval Base the following month. The ship was also involved in the search for the crewmembers of the  yacht Berserk in 2012, but had to turn back due to the weather which the captain called the worst storm he had ever seen in 19 years. During that mission the ship lost three 50-person life rafts of which one was discovered by the Sea Shepherd Conservation Society vessel .

On 14 January 2015 Wellington intercepted three fishing vessels, Songhua Kunlun and YongDing, which were allegedly fishing illegally in Antarctic waters. The fishing vessels refused to be boarded and poor weather and sea conditions prevented Wellington from forcing the issue.

Wellington was involved in seabed surveys off Kaikoura after the 2016 Kaikoura earthquake.

On 19 July 2021 HMNZS Wellington delivered 120 vials of the Pfizer–BioNTech COVID-19 vaccine to Tokelau's Nukunonu atoll, which is sufficient to vaccinate 720 people.

In response to the 2022 Hunga Tonga–Hunga Ha'apai eruption and tsunami, Wellington and HMNZS Aotearoa were deployed to provide water supplies, survey teams, and helicopter support.

Upgrades 
Both  and HMNZS Wellington have recently gone through minor upgrades, including sensors and weapons, and replacing the 25 mm Bushmaster with the Rafael Typhoon 25 mm stabilised naval gun.

See also
 Patrol boats of the Royal New Zealand Navy

References

External links

 Official website
 

Protector-class offshore patrol vessels
2010 ships